The 2012 Southern Utah Thunderbirds football team represented Southern Utah University in the Big Sky Conference during the 2012 NCAA Division I FCS football season. Led by fifth-year head coach Ed Lamb, the Thunderbirds played their home games at Eccles Coliseum in Cedar City, Utah.

In their first year as a member of the Big Sky, they were 5–6 overall (4–4 in Big Sky, tied for fifth).

Schedule

Game summaries

Utah State

Sources:

Cal

Sources:

New Mexico Highlands

Sources:

Portland State

Sources:

Montana State

Sources:

Sacramento State

Sources:

Montana

Sources:

Weber State

Sources:

Eastern Washington

Sources:

North Dakota

Sources:

Northern Arizona

Sources:

References

Southern Utah
Southern Utah Thunderbirds football seasons
Southern Utah Thunderbirds football